Ray Anderson Barnhart (January 12, 1928 – May 26, 2013) was an American businessman who served as Federal Highway Administrator from 1981 to 1987. He started his career as City Councilman in Pasadena, Texas. He was a member of the Texas House of Representatives 100th district from and served from January 9, 1973 to January 14, 1975. He was an Eagle Scout. He also served as Chairman for the Texas State Republican Party

References

1928 births
2013 deaths
Members of the Texas House of Representatives
Texas Republican state chairmen
Administrators of the Federal Highway Administration
Businesspeople from Texas
Place of birth missing
Place of death missing
Reagan administration personnel